Idrettslaget Skjergard is a Norwegian sports club from Øygarden. It has sections for football.

The club was founded on 16 December 1989 as an amalgamation of three local teams. The club colors are white. The men's football team currently resides in the Fifth Division (sixth tier). It last played in the Third Division in 1995. Its best known player is Tommy Knarvik.

References

Football clubs in Norway
Association football clubs established in 1989
Sport in Hordaland
Øygarden
1989 establishments in Norway